Madhu Pandit Dasa is a spiritual leader and the President of ISKCON Bangalore. As a humanitarian, he has been actively involved in programs like Akshaya Patra that provides free mid-day meals to children studying in Government schools. He is the Founder and Chairman of The Akshaya Patra Foundation, guiding the organisation to realise the vision - "No child in India shall be deprived of education because of hunger”. The Government of India has conferred upon him the prestigious Padma Shri Award in recognition of the distinguished service rendered by Akshaya Patra Foundation for the children of India. He is also the Chairman of Vrindavan Chandrodaya Mandir, the upcoming iconic cultural and heritage complex in Vrindavan.

Biography

Madhu Pandit Dasa, a passionate student of science, was selected by the highly reputed national talent search program of the country during his pre-degree. Having found the path that answered his quest for the absolute truth, right after his days in IIT-Bombay, Madhu Pandit Dasa dedicated his life to serving the mission of His Divine Grace A.C.Bhaktivedanta Swami Prabhupada. He has nearly three decades of self-less work behind him. He has been instrumental in conceiving and implementing many social initiatives that impact millions of people in this country, giving them a better quality of life. Besides his achievements in the social sector, he has evolved innovative ideas in presenting the ancient cultural ethos of India in a modern scientific and technological context.

The Akshaya Patra Foundation

July 2000 saw the beginning of an initiative led by Madhu Pandit Dasa - the Akshaya Patra Foundation. The purpose of the Foundation was to serve underprivileged children by providing mid-day meals at Government schools of Bengaluru Rural District. To meet the requirement of preparing meals in large quantity, a centralised kitchen was designed by Madhu Pandit Dasa. He also gave the Foundation a working Governance Model, where transparency and accountability are the core values. Based on these values, Akshaya Patra has become one of the few trustworthy NGOs in the country. Demonstrating this point, Akshaya Patra has been awarded the Institute of Chartered Accountants of India (ICAI)’s Gold Shield Award for Excellence in Financial Reporting consecutively five times, placing the Foundation in its Hall of Fame. Akshaya Patra has spanned 17 years and during this has grown from providing mid-day meals to 1,500 children to 1.6 million children.

Inspiration
The teachings of Srila Prabhupada, the Founder-Acharya of ISKCON and the Inspiration behind the Akshaya Patra programme has been Madhu Pandit Dasa's guiding light throughout his journey as a missionary.
Srila Prabhupada’s biography inspired Madhu Pandit Dasa to join the International Society of Krishna Consciousness (ISKCON).

Honors and recognition
 National Living Legend Award 
 Padma Shri award on 67th Republic Day by the Government of India.
(The award has been conferred in recognition of the distinguished service rendered by Akshaya Patra Foundation for the children of India.)

 Distinguished Alumnus Award 2010 by the Indian Institute of Technology Bombay
 Distinguished International Gandhi peace award in 2019 for his contribution towards society by feeding midday meals to the school going poor children, marking a remarkable 3-billion plus meals
 Honorary Doctorate by the Bangalore University during its 56th Annual convocation for his selfless service over the last four decades in the field of food security and community welfare
 Honorary Doctorate by Poornima University, Rajasthan for his service to humanity

References

Living people
Recipients of the Padma Shri in social work
Indian civil engineers
Engineers from Kerala
Scientists from Thiruvananthapuram
20th-century Indian engineers
Indian children's rights activists
20th-century Indian educators
IIT Bombay alumni
Year of birth missing (living people)